Cutina is a genus of moths in the family Erebidae.

Species
 Cutina albopunctella Walker, 1866
 Cutina aluticolor Pogue & Ferguson, 1998
 Cutina arcuata Pogue & Ferguson, 1998
 Cutina distincta Grote, 1883

References
 Cutina at Markku Savela's Lepidoptera and Some Other Life Forms
 Natural History Museum Lepidoptera genus database

Poaphilini
Moth genera